Jelena Pandžić (born 17 March 1983) is a retired tennis player from Croatia.

Tennis career
She began playing tennis at the age of seven and was considered a very promising junior player, achieving a world No. 1 ranking in the under-14 category. In the mid-1990s, she was spotted by Nick Bollettieri who personally coached her for a time.

1999–2002
Pandžić's first senior tournament on the ITF Circuit was in April 1999 where she qualified and reached the quarterfinals of the Makarska $10k tournament. By 2002, she had made some progress up the rankings, winning three ITF singles titles, but had not yet fulfilled her initial promise. Her highest ranking was 374, achieved in October 2002.

2003–2006
In 2003, Pandžić only played one game of tennis before a car crash put her out of action. Over the next few years, she did not play in any professional ranking tournaments. Instead, she attended university in the USA and played on the college tennis circuit, representing Fresno Pacific University.

2007
In May 2007, Pandžić once more began playing on the professional circuit, and this time she began to put together an impressive string of results. Despite beginning with no ranking and having to qualify for the lowest tier of events, she reached a year-end ranking of 255, having won four of the 13 tournaments she entered.

2008–2009
Although she began 2008 with three first-round losses, Pandžić continued her climb-up the rankings. Her first appearance in the main draw of a WTA Tour event came when she qualified for the Prague Open. However, she lost in the first round to Melinda Czink.

In May 2008, with a ranking of 189, she was able to enter the qualifying rounds of the French Open. With wins over Eva Hrdinová, Julie Coin and Monica Niculescu, Pandžić managed to qualify for the main draw of a Grand Slam tournament for the first time in her career. She then won her first-round match against Séverine Brémond in three sets, but was beaten heavily, 6–2, 6–0, in the second round by Agnieszka Radwańska, the 14th seed.

As well as the WTA and ITF events, Pandžić also plays for professional teams in both Germany and the USA. She then was part of the St. Louis Aces team for the 2008 World TeamTennis league, alongside Anna Kournikova and Andy Roddick.

The end of 2008 saw Pandžić losing repeatedly in first rounds, and this continued through January 2009, when she disclosed she has been playing with a calf injury for some time, and was not sure if she will be able to continue playing professional tennis.

2010
At the end of May 2010, Pandžić started her second comeback by qualifying for and winning a $10k event in Sumter, South Carolina. In addition to playing well in a number of other ITF events, she has used her protected ranking of 136 to enter some WTA tournaments as well, losing tight matches to high ranked players. In a time of just over three months, she has accumulated 50 points and a record of 16–5 and is ranked 548 as of early August. She entered the qualifying of the US Open beating Sarah Gronert in the first round before losing to Alexandra Panova, 2–6, 3–6 in the second.

ITF Circuit finals

Singles: 16 (11–5)

Doubles: 8 (5–3)

References

External links
 
 

1983 births
Living people
Croatian female tennis players
Tennis players from Split, Croatia